Seapatrick is a civil parish in County Down, Northern Ireland. It lies partly across the three historic baronies of Iveagh Upper, Upper Half, Iveagh Lower, Lower Half and Iveagh Lower, Upper Half.

Civil parish of Seapatrick
The civil parish centres on the town of Banbridge.

Townlands
The civil parish contains the following townlands:

B
Balleevy, Ballydown, Ballykeel, Ballykelly, Ballylough, Ballymoney, Ballyvally

D
Dooghary, Drumnagally, Drumnavaddy

E
Edenderry

K
Kilpike

L
Lisnafiffy, Lisnaree

T
Tullyconnaught, Tullyear

See also
List of civil parishes of County Down
List of townlands in County Down

References